The Moyes Malibu is an Australian high-wing, single-place, hang glider designed and produced by Moyes Delta Gliders of Kurnell, New South Wales. The aircraft is supplied complete and ready-to-fly.

Design and development
The Malibu was designed as a beginner and intermediate hang glider, but is often used as a dune soaring machine, due to its low stall speed and maneuverability. It is made from aluminum tubing, with its single-surface wing covered in Dacron sailcloth.

The Malibu2 version replaced the original Malibu in production. It incorporates many improvements to the original design, including a reinforced trailing edge, an improved sail cut to improve stall, roll, pitch, long with its performance characteristics and a ball bearing-mounted wing tip to enhance the flexing of the tip.

Variants
Malibu 190
Original model built in the mid-2000s. Its  span wing is cable braced from a single kingpost.
Malibu2 166
Improved model in production in 2016. Its  span wing is cable braced from a single kingpost.
Malibu2 188
Improved model in production in 2016. Its  span wing is cable braced from a single kingpost.

Specifications (Malibu2 188)

References

External links

Malibu
Hang gliders